Damas Daniel Ndumbaro (born 14 June 1971) is a Minister of Natural Resources and Tourism and a politician who presently serves as a Chama Cha Mapinduzi's Member of Parliament for Songea Urban constituency for the second term since 2015. Also was the acting Chief Executive Officer of the Tanzania-Zambia Railway Authority since March 2013. He was an Advocate and a Lecturer of law at the Open University of Tanzania before joining politics and won a majority vote election in Songea Urban constituency under the ruling party CCM.

Political career
In 2018, he was appointed by President John Magufuli, as the deputy minister of Foreign Affairs and East African Cooperation. In December 2020 after the 2020 general election, in Magufuli's 2nd cabinet he was appointed the Minister of Natural Resources and Tourism. 
He continued in this docket following the death of Magufuli, however, in April 2022 he was made the new Minister of Constitutional Affairs and Justice in Samia Suluhu's cabinet.

References

Living people
University of Dar es Salaam alumni
Open University of Tanzania alumni
Chama Cha Mapinduzi politicians
Chama Cha Mapinduzi MPs
Tanzanian MPs 2015–2020
Tanzanian MPs 2020–2025
Deputy government ministers of Tanzania
Government ministers of Tanzania
1971 births
Tanzanian Roman Catholics